HMS Thorough was a British submarine of the third group of the T class. She was built as P324 by Vickers Armstrong, Barrow, and launched on 30 October 1943.  So far she has been the only ship of the Royal Navy to bear the name Thorough.

Service

Thorough served in the Far East for much of her wartime career, where she sank twenty seven Japanese sailing vessels,  seven coasters, a small Japanese vessel, a Japanese barge, a small Japanese gunboat, a Japanese trawler, and the Malaysian sailing vessel Palange.  In August 1945, in company with HMS Taciturn, she attacked Japanese shipping and shore targets off northern Bali. Thorough sank a Japanese coaster and a sailing vessel with gunfire.

On 16 December 1957 Thorough returned to HMS Dolphin, Portsmouth Dockyard, after completing the first circumnavigation by a submarine. While in Australian waters, on 2 August 1956, she rescued one of the four survivors of the sinking of the 'sixty-miler', Birchgrove Park.

She survived the war and continued in service with the Navy, finally being scrapped at Dunston on Tyne on 29 June 1962.

References

 
 

 

British T-class submarines of the Royal Navy
Ships built in Barrow-in-Furness
1943 ships
World War II submarines of the United Kingdom
Cold War submarines of the United Kingdom